Undertow is the second album by Drenge released on 6 April 2015. Their first release since expanding to a three-piece with the addition of bassist Rob Graham, who played on three tracks, the album was produced by Ross Orton and recorded at McCall Sound Studios in late 2014.

The album was announced on 27 January 2015 and the band performed a track from it on The Late Show with David Letterman the same day, their first appearance on American television.

The album's release was followed by a UK tour in April 2015.

The first single to be taken from the album, "We Can Do What We Want", was released in January 2015.

Accolades

Track listing

Personnel
Drenge
Eoin Loveless – lead vocals, guitar
Rory Loveless – drums
Rob Graham – bass guitar

Charts

References

2015 albums
Drenge (band) albums
Infectious Music albums